The Black Hammer Party, formerly the Black Hammer Organization and commonly known as the Black Hammers, is a radical African American political organization that advocates black separatism, conservatism, and political violence. The organization was founded in Atlanta, Georgia in 2019, by ex-members of the African People's Socialist Party, and has undergone a transition from far-left politics to far-right politics. It rose to prominence in the early 2020s amidst the George Floyd protests and the 2020–2022 United States racial unrest, when it attempted to construct a compound in the Rocky Mountains which it named "Hammer City."

The Atlanta Journal-Constitution described the organization as mixing "Black nationalist rhetoric and a revolutionary message with hot-button issues like anti-vaccine myths and election conspiracies." Commentators, including former leaders and members, have referred to the organization as a cult. The group reportedly recruits among the homeless and LGBT populations.

History

Early history and ideology
The group was founded as the Black Hammer Organization in 2019 in Atlanta by "a handful of activists with backgrounds in radical Black communist organizing." By 2020, membership increased significantly following the murder of George Floyd and the ensuing protests across the United States, with the organization amassing "hundreds" of members and chapters across the country. The group called for a black and Native American-led revolution and a separate homeland, as well as reparations from white "colonizers." The Daily Beast described the group's rhetoric as both anti-white and antisemitic.

One of the founding members, Gazi Kodzo (born Augustus Cornelius Romain Jr.), eventually rose as the organization's leader, which according to a founding member who defected, caused the group to go "from a vehicle of liberation to one of abuse and toxicity." Other former members have accused Kodzo of "overworking members in sweatshop conditions" and "[manipulating] members into breaking up with life partners and spouses." Later allegations stated that Kodzo had infiltrated the Black Hammer Party and engaged in forced labor against party members.

Kodzo is known for his controversial social media presence. On January 24, 2021, he released a video wearing Joker makeup and calling Holocaust victim Anne Frank a "bleach demon," a "colonizer," a "parasite", and a "Karen," and claiming that he was going to burn copies of her diary for warmth. According to The Forward, the group's membership began to decline around early August 2021 due to "Kevin Rashid Johnson of the New Afrikan Black Panther Party [accusing] the organization of being an undercover right-wing group trying to sow division within leftist movements."

The organization under Kodzo's leadership has also opposed vaccination for COVID-19, and on September 15, 2021, led a protest outside the Atlanta headquarters of the Centers for Disease Control and Prevention in support of rapper Nicki Minaj, who at the time claimed to not have been vaccinated. In December of the same year, Kodzo also claimed to have formed an alliance with far-right organization Proud Boys, and hosted a podcast alongside Proud Boys founder Gavin McInnes, claiming to be forming a "coalition to defeat the disgusting pedo-loving, welfare economy demoncrats [sic] and their puppet master, Big Pharma." 

In 2021, Kodzo began to distance himself from Black Lives Matter. He stated that this was "because of my stance on pedophilia and the fact that I started reading the Bible more." The group has since supported the Supreme Court overturning Roe v. Wade, and the 2022 Russian invasion of Ukraine.

Attempts to establish Hammer City 
On May 3, 2021, the group announced that they had "liberated" 200 acres of land somewhere in Colorado, – later revealed to be Beaver Pines, San Miguel County – after raising over US$60,000 in donations (eventually reaching $112,000). Named the "Hammer City," they claimed through Facebook that the soil was "rich" and that "colonized people need their own land, their own space, their own modes of production [...]."

On May 14, the group missed a deadline to sign the documents for acquiring the land. On May 17, following reports of group members still squatting on the land while carrying firearms and wearing military gear, and after a brief armed standoff with a local man, the group was escorted out of the property by deputies of the San Miguel County police in the evening. The San Miguel County Sheriff later inspected the property, finding an unfinished footbridge over a drainage ditch, a real estate sign riddled with bullet holes, and 4-inch screws scattered on the road.

Fayetteville police raid 
On July 19, 2022, police in Fayetteville, Georgia received an anonymous call from someone claiming to be held against their will in a home rented by the Black Hammer Party. A SWAT team was sent to search the home, where there were ten people inside. Nine walked out willingly. An 18-year-old man identified as Amonte T. Ammons was killed by an apparent self-inflicted gunshot to the head. The duration of the standoff was several hours, and the surrounding neighborhood received a shelter-in-place order. 

Gazi Kodzo was arrested and charged with aggravated sodomy, conspiracy, false imprisonment, kidnapping, aggravated assault, and street gang activity. Another man, an associate of Kodzo named Xavier H. Rushin, was arrested and charged with kidnapping, assault, and false imprisonment. The group is under joint investigation by the FBI and local authorities. According to a local street gang investigator, the group had been under surveillance by police for months prior to the incident.

Alleged Russian influence 
On July 29, 2022, the U.S. Department of Justice made public information about alleged Russian influence operations involving collaboration with American political organizations. It did not name the groups directly. However, based on the released information, the Black Hammer Party (allegedly "U.S. Political Group 2" in the released document) was among the groups implicated in these activities, according to multiple media reports. 

According to these reports, the Black Hammer Party had received funding from Russian citizen Aleksandr Viktorovich Ionov, an individual with connections to the Russian government. This would have been used to fund the group's protest at the headquarters of Meta Platforms, Facebook's parent company, due to the latter's censorship of posts supporting the 2022 Russian invasion of Ukraine.

According to the released information, the implicated groups would have received "direction or control over them on behalf of the FSB", through Ionov. The Colorado Times Recorder indicated that the Black Hammer Party was linked to another group under investigation for ties to Russia, the African People's Socialist Party, by way of Kodzo (referred to by the publication as "August Romaine Jr.") who had previously been a key member in both organizations.

References 

2019 establishments in Georgia (U.S. state)
African-American-related controversies
African-American history of Colorado
African-American history of Georgia (U.S. state)
African American–Jewish relations
African–Native American relations
African and Black nationalism in the United States
Anti-capitalist political parties
Anti-Zionist political parties
Antisemitism in the United States
Anti-vaccination organizations
Anti-white racism in the United States
Fascist parties
Black political parties in the United States
Black separatism
Conspiracy theories in the United States
Cults
Homelessness in the United States
Organizations based in Atlanta
Political parties established in 2019
Post–civil rights era in African-American history
Reparations for slavery
Russia–United States relations